Almerigo Grilz (11 March 1953 – 19 May 1987) was an Italian right wing politician, and an independent war correspondent.

He was born in Trieste, then Zone A of the Free Territory of Trieste, now part of Region Friuli-Venezia Giulia, Italy. His last name is of Slovenian origin. During his youth, he was a leader of the nationalist right wing Youth Front (Fronte della gioventù) and then of the Italian Social Movement – National Right of Trieste. He was also a member of the City Council of Trieste. In 1977, Almerigo Grilz  was the leader of Trieste section of the Youth Front, becoming the Deputy National Secretary by a direct appointment of then secretary Gianfranco Fini. During this time he was also a member of the Journalist order of Trieste and cooperated with the Dissenso, the official journal of the Youth Front.

Politician and war journalist
As a teenager, he showed a considerable ability as photographer, and sketcher. He was also an avid reader particularly enjoying war stories, and comics in general. During this time he likes to walk in the city taking picture and short films over city's everyday life. It has been reported that, his political passion started one day during one of his early reportages, when he was around with his camera taking pictures of a demonstration.  At the Police charge of the demonstrators he was forced to run, seeking refuge inside the MSI seat of Trieste, in Via Paduina. More work was to come for him in the late sixties. Following the reorganization of the Italian dockyard system, the C.I.P.E, or (Commissione Interministeriale per la Programmazione Economica) (Economical Planning Interdepartmental Committee) decided the grouping of the Cantieri Riuniti Adriatico of Trieste and Monfalcone ("United Shipbuilders of the Adriatic") into one company, and set its new headquarters in Genoa. On 8 October 1966 the grouping plan was implemented and as expected the local population reacted. The ship building was one of the city's excellence, since the Austrian days. Many Triestini had made up their living working at the dockyards. This ignite a demonstration against the dockyard grouping and the consequent loss of jobs. During those days Grilz was again on the streets taking pictures of the demonstration. The protests of 1968 comprised a worldwide escalation of social conflicts, and Italy was not immune and he documented the social disorder and the demonstrations. In 1970 he founded the "Centro Nazionale Audiovisivo", an amateur documentary center. After a degree in Law, he started travelling. He was attracted by northern countries, where he profusely travelled by every means. He loved the order, the Northern countries vision of life and society. In those years he visited Denmark and Scandinavia; however he was particularly attracted by London and Britain. He learnt English very quickly becoming soon very fluent, and deeply loved British people. His passion for Britain can be also seen, in many of his early sketches, where he depicted war scenes of Tommies defeating Nazis. On 29 April 1981 he documented Charles and Diana wedding. [1]
In the mid-1980s he became a full-time freelance war journalist, resigning his seat in the Trieste City Council. His job kept him away from home for 10 months a year. He witnessed all the conflicts from mid 70's, from the Soviet occupation of Afghanistan to the Israeli’s operation in Lebanon; the conflicts between Druses and Christian Maronites; and the Myanmar-Thailand border war between Keren minority and Myanmar regulars. His reportages were sold all over the world and bought by CBS, France 3 and NBC. These important networks would subsequently hire Grilz as correspondent in other parts of the world. On a direct NBC request Grilz followed the Communist Philippine Guerrilla and the elections that led to the fall of the late Philippines dictator Ferdinand Marcos and the subsequent election of Corazon Aquino.

The Albatros press agency
In 1983 together with Gian Micalessin and Fausto Biloslavo, he founded the “Albatros Press Agency”. This agency would produce reportages, documentaries and articles, from every part of the world, where revolutions and war were fought.
The agency sold a lot of its productions to foreign television networks, in particular in US and UK; also in Italy Albatros managed to sell its products to important networks, such as the Panorama weekly magazine and the Italian 1st TV channel news or TG Uno, this despite the high prejudice of the major Italian network for those who were considered culturally close to the MSI-DN right-wing party.

Death

On 19 May 1987 in Mozambique, while witnessing a battle between “Renamo’s” militiamen and the regular Army, Grilz was struck by a stray bullet in the head. His body was never recovered and buried close to where he was killed by, an English free-lance reporter.
The news of Almerigo Griltz’s death, due to the prejudice, did not echo loudly  in the Italian press world. Only in the late 1990s he would be listed as an Italian press agent,  fallen in war zone.
The “ Unità” the communist official newspaper wrote of the death of a “mercenary” when reported to Grilz's death.
An exception was Tg Uno which, thanks to Paolo Frajese, remembered Grilz even against the opinion of directors; Renato Farina, a writer for the weekly magazine “Il Sabato”, and  Ettore Mo, also a special correspondent in the hot spots for the major Italian newspaper “Corriere della Sera” and a fellow journalist who went to various world hot spots, remembered the death and life of Almerigo Grilz. The name of Almerigo Grilz has been immortalized on the “Reporters sans frontiers " Monument in Normandy, dedicated to all the fallen war journalists.
The city of Trieste has named a street in his honor.

Micalessin Documentary Of Grilz' Death
In 2002 Micalessin, a co-founder with Griltz of the Press Agency Albatros, longed to see the place where Grilz lived his last moments. Being also keen to know the whereabouts of his remains, he realized a TV Documentary in which he included the last scenes shot by Grilz just before his death.

References

Italian Television reportage “ Terra” by Tony Capuozzo dedicated a story on Grilz on May 20, 2007.

1953 births
1987 deaths
Politicians from Trieste
Italian male journalists
Writers from Trieste
20th-century Italian journalists
20th-century Italian male writers